Events from the year 1532 in India.

Events
 Sevappa Nayak governor of Thanjavur founds the Thanjavur Nayak kingdom and reigns (until 1560)

Births
 Tulsidas, poet author of Ramcharitmanas (died 1623)

Deaths
 Raja Shiladitya, a Tomar Rajput chieftain of northeast Malwa dies (year of birth unknown)

See also

 Timeline of Indian history

References

 
India